Cryptadia is a monotypic snout moth genus described by Alfred Jefferis Turner in 1913. Its single species, described in the same publication, Cryptadia xuthobela, is known from Australia.

References

Cryptoblabini
Monotypic moth genera
Moths of Australia
Pyralidae genera